Balantiopsidaceae is a family of liverworts belonging to the order Jungermanniales.

Subfamilies and genera:
 Acroscyphella N.Kitag. & Grolle (not assigned to a subfamily)
 Pseudoisotachis Vána (not assigned to a subfamily)
 Balantiopsidoideae J.J.Engel & Vána
 Balantiopsis Mitt.
 Isotachidoideae Grolle
 Isotachis Mitt.
 Neesioscyphus Grolle
 Ruizanthoideae R.M.Schust. ex J.J.Engel & G.L.Merr.
 Ruizanthus R.M.Schust.

References

Jungermanniales
Liverwort families